The 2017 European Darts Trophy was the twelfth of twelve PDC European Tour events on the 2017 PDC Pro Tour. The tournament took place at Lokhalle, Göttingen, Germany, between 13–15 October 2017. It featured a field of 48 players and £135,000 in prize money, with £25,000 going to the winner.

Michael van Gerwen was the defending champion after defeating Mensur Suljović 6–5 in the final of the 2016 tournament, and he retained his title by defeating Rob Cross 6–4 in the final.

Prize money
This is how the prize money is divided:

Qualification and format
The top 16 entrants from the PDC ProTour Order of Merit on 21 September automatically qualified for the event and were seeded in the second round.

The remaining 32 places went to players from five qualifying events - 18 from the UK Qualifier (held in Dublin on 28 September), eight from the West/South European Qualifier (held on 21 September), four from the Host Nation Qualifier (held on 12 October), one from the Nordic & Baltic Qualifier (held on 12 August) and one from the East European Qualifier (held on 27 August).

Mensur Suljović withdrew prior to the start of the tournament for family reasons. As he was a seeded player, all seeds from 7–16 moved up one place, with the highest-ranked qualifier, Stephen Bunting, being assigned as the 16th seed. An extra Host Nation Qualifier was made available as a result.

The following players took part in the tournament:

Top 16
  Michael van Gerwen (winner)
  Peter Wright (third round)
  Michael Smith (quarter-finals)
  Simon Whitlock (semi-finals)
  Daryl Gurney (second round)
  Rob Cross (runner-up)
  Dave Chisnall (quarter-finals)
  Alan Norris (third round)
  Joe Cullen (quarter-finals)
  Jelle Klaasen (third round)
  Benito van de Pas (second round)
  Ian White (second round)
  Mervyn King (second round)
  Gerwyn Price (second round)
  Kim Huybrechts (semi-finals)
  Stephen Bunting (third round)

UK Qualifier
  Andy Boulton (quarter-finals)
  Keegan Brown (third round)
  Mick Todd (first round)
  Jonathan Worsley (first round)
  James Wade (first round)
  Chris Quantock (first round)
  Steve West (second round)
  Jamie Caven (second round)
  Robert Thornton (first round)
  Ricky Evans (first round)
  Chris Dobey (second round)
  James Wilson (second round)
  Jonny Clayton (third round)
  John Bowles (first round)
  Kevin Painter (first round)
  James Richardson (second round)
  Nathan Aspinall (second round)

West/South European Qualifier
  Christian Kist (first round)
  Zoran Lerchbacher (second round)
  Jermaine Wattimena (second round)
  Vincent van der Voort (third round)
  Dimitri Van den Bergh (first round)
  Jan Dekker (third round)
  Yordi Meeuwisse (first round)
  Jeffrey de Zwaan (first round)

Host Nation Qualifier
  René Eidams (second round)
  Martin Schindler (second round)
  Robert Allenstein (first round)
  Nico Blum (first round)
  Manfred Bilderl (first round)

Nordic & Baltic Qualifier
  Madars Razma (first round)

East European Qualifier
  Krzysztof Ratajski (second round)

Draw

References

2017 PDC European Tour
2017 in German sport